Watsapon Jueapan (born August 19, 1995) is a Thai professional footballer who plays as a centre-back.

References

External links
 
 https://www.livesoccer888.com/thaipremierleague/teams/Suphanburi-FC/Players/Watsapon-Jueapan

1995 births
Living people
Watsapon Jueapan
Association football defenders
Watsapon Jueapan
Watsapon Jueapan
Watsapon Jueapan